Shamzagh (also Romanized as Shamzāgh; also known as Shamrāgh) is a village in Howmeh Rural District, in the Central District of Larestan County, Fars Province, Iran. At the 2006 census, its population was 20, in 4 families.

References 

Populated places in Larestan County